The Cartoonstitute was a planned Cartoon Network project created by Cartoon Network's executive Rob Sorcher that would have been a showcase for animated shorts created without the interference of network executives and focus testing. It was headed by Craig McCracken (creator of The Powerpuff Girls, Foster's Home for Imaginary Friends, Wander Over Yonder and Kid Cosmic) and Rob Renzetti (creator of My Life as a Teenage Robot). 39 shorts for the project were in development at Cartoon Network Studios, but only 14 of these were completed. Eventually, balancing 5 upcoming shows and adding another proved difficult and the project was scrapped. Of the shorts which were made, only Regular Show and Uncle Grandpa have been greenlit to become animated series. On May 7, 2010, Cartoon Network released nearly all of the shorts to their website. The only shorts not released were Maruined, 3 Dog Band, and Joey to the World.

History
The series was first announced on April 3, 2008, at Cartoon Network's annual upfront in New York City. The project was to be similar to The Cartoon Cartoon Show (also known as the What a Cartoon! Show) which aired on the network more than a decade earlier and gave birth to some of the channel's first animated series, such as Dexter's Laboratory, The Powerpuff Girls and Cow and Chicken. The Cartoonstitute was to establish a think tank and create an environment in which animators can create characters and stories. A section of Cartoon Network Studios in Burbank, California, was set aside exclusively for the project. The "Cartoonstitute" name was imagined by Lauren Faust, the wife of Craig McCracken. The first short to appear legally online via Vimeo was "3 Dog Band: Get It Together" on July 29, 2009. On September 26, 2009, all 14 completed shorts were posted on YouTube and the account was deleted shortly after posting them.

List of completed shorts
All shorts of the project were developed and produced in 2009, despite their release in 2010.

Rejected/Unproduced
While there are 25 unfinished shorts remain unreleased, there are currently 6 known pitches/concepts for The Cartoonstitute that may or may not had their produced pilot short (this makes it a total remaining 18 unknown pitches).

References

Unaired television shows